Giorgio Cornaro (1524–1578) was a Roman Catholic prelate who served as Bishop of Treviso (1538–1577) and Apostolic Nuncio to Florence (1561–1565).

Biography
Giorgio Cornaro was born in Venice, Italy on 26 February 1524.
In 20 February 1538, he was appointed during the papacy of Pope Paul III as Bishop of Treviso.
On 1552, he was consecrated bishop by Francesco Pisani, Bishop of Padua. 
On 13 January 1561, he was appointed during the papacy of Pope Pius IV as Apostolic Nuncio to Florence.
On 8 February 1565, he resigned as Apostolic Nuncio to Florence.
He served as Bishop of Treviso until his resignation on 29 November 1577. 
He died in 1578.

References

External links and additional sources
 (for Chronology of Bishops) 
 (for Chronology of Bishops) 
 (for Chronology of Bishops) 

16th-century Roman Catholic bishops in the Republic of Venice
Bishops appointed by Pope Paul III
Bishops appointed by Pope Pius IV
1524 births
1578 deaths